Born to Be Wild is a Philippine television travel documentary show broadcast by GMA Network. Originally hosted by Romi Garduce and Ferds Recio, it premiered on November 28, 2007 on the network's evening line up replacing Palaban. Recio and Nielsen Donato currently serve as the hosts.

Overview
It features stories about wildlife and the environment and its hosts' weekly expeditions to the country's frontiers.

Hosts
 Ferds Recio 
 Nielsen Donato 

Former hosts
 Kiko Rustia 
 Mariz Umali 
 Romi Garduce

Production
In March 2020, production was halted due to the enhanced community quarantine in Luzon caused by the COVID-19 pandemic. The show resumed its programming on August 2, 2020.

Accolades

References

External links
 
 

2007 Philippine television series debuts
Filipino-language television shows
GMA Network original programming
GMA Integrated News and Public Affairs shows
Philippine documentary television series
Philippine travel television series
Television productions suspended due to the COVID-19 pandemic